John Watson (born 1 April 1947) is a former British cyclist. He competed in the team time trial at the 1968 Summer Olympics.

References

1947 births
Living people
British male cyclists
Olympic cyclists of Great Britain
Cyclists at the 1968 Summer Olympics